The list of Chicago State University people includes notable alumni, non-graduates, faculty and staff, chief executives, and affiliates of the Chicago State University.

Academe
James A. Banks, founding director, Center for Multicultural Education, University of Washington. Banks received his bachelor's degree in social science and education from Chicago State University in 1963.
 Martin Ridge, historian and director of research at the Huntington Library. He earned his bachelor of education at CSU in 1943.
 Jack Dongarra, Distinguished Professor of Computer Science at the University of Tennessee. He earned his bachelor of science in mathematics at CSU.
 Jokari T. Miller, Robotics Engineer, tech startup founder, and author of "Nanotech Revolution: Using Science & Technology to free Africa from Subjugation"; and N.M.N. Theory (Nuclear Material Neutralization Theory): Using Nano-Robotics to Render Nuclear Weapons Useless/Harmless. He received a B.S. (Bachelor of Science) from CSU in 2014.
 Cynthia Nance, Nathan G. Gordon Professor of Law at the University of Arkansas School of Law. She graduated magna cum laude from Chicago State University.
 Margaret Taylor-Burroughs, co-founder of the DuSable Museum of African American History.

Activism
 Margaret A. Haley, teacher, unionist, and land value tax activist. She took classes for several years at CSU when it was Cook County Normal University.
 Mamie Till, activist, educator, and mother of Emmett Till. She graduated from CSU.
 Jacqueline B. Vaughn, first woman serve as President of the Chicago Teachers Union.

Athletics
 Deji Akindele, professional basketball player for Yalova Group BelediyeSpor of the Turkish Basketball First League.
 Darron Brittman, former basketball player who is best known as the first officially recognized NCAA Division I season steals leader in 1985–86.
 Josephine D'Angelo, left fielder who played from  through  in the All-American Girls Professional Baseball League. She later earned her masters from CSU.
 James "Chico" Hernandez, FIAS World Cup Vice-Champion in Sombo Wrestling. He graduated from CSU.
 David Holston, basketball player for JDA Dijon Basket of France's LNB Pro A. He played for the Chicago State Cougars men's basketball team.
 Bob Janecyk, goaltender for the Chicago Blackhawks from 1983 to 1984 and the Los Angeles Kings from 1984 to 1989. He played for CSU and graduated in 1978.
 John Mallee, Major League Baseball hitting coach. Mallee is with the Philadelphia Phillies. He attended CSU.
 Wayne Molis, professional basketball player who played for the New York Knicks from 1966-1967. He played for the Chicago State Cougars men's basketball team.
 Royce Parran, professional basketball player who last played for Belfius Mons-Hainaut of the Belgian Basketball League. He played for the Chicago State Cougars men's basketball team.
 Clarke Rosenberg (born 1993), American-Israeli basketball player in the Israel Basketball Premier League
 Tony Weeden, professional basketball player. He played for the Chicago State Cougars men's basketball team.
 Willye White, first American track and field athlete to take part in five Olympics, competing on the 1956, 1960, 1964, 1968, and 1972 teams respectively. She graduated from CSU in 1976 with a degree in public health administration.

Arts and entertainment
 William D. Alexander, film producer. He studied at CSU for several years.
 John Curulewski, guitarist, vocalist and founding member of Styx. He attended CSU in the late 1960s and early 1970s.
 Dennis DeYoung, singer, songwriter and founding member of Styx. He attended CSU in the late 1960s and early 1970s.
 Tina Howe, playwright of Museum, The Art of Dining, Painting Churches, Coastal Disturbances and Pride's Crossing.
 RM Johnson, author of The Harris Men, The Million Dollar Divorce, Love Frustration and The Million Dollar Demise. He graduated from CSU.
 Nicole Mitchell, jazz flautist. In addition to being an alumna, she has been a part-time instructor at CSU.
 Chuck Panozzo, bass guitarist and founding member of Styx. He attended CSU in the late 1960s and early 1970s.
 John Panozzo, drummer and founding member of Styx. He attended CSU in the late 1960s and early 1970s.
 Kanye West, rapper and record producer. West attended CSU, but did not graduate, hence his debut album title The College Dropout.
 Steven Whitehurst, author, poet and educator. He graduated from CSU in 1990.

Business
 Edith Heath, studio potter and founder of Heath Ceramics.

Government and law

U.S. Government and politics
 Danny K. Davis (1968), member of the United States House of Representatives from Illinois's 7th congressional district since 1997.
 Blanche M. Manning, United States district judge of the United States District Court for the Northern District of Illinois. She graduated from CSU in 1961, earning a Bachelor of Education.
 William J. Walker, Major General United States Army, commanding general, District of Columbia National Guard. He earned a Master of Science degree from CSU in 1990.
 Aaron S. Williams, 18th Director of the Peace Corps. He graduated from CSU.

State and local politics
 Howard B. Brookins Sr., Democratic member of the Illinois Senate from 1987 to 1993.
 Isaac "Ike" Carothers, former alderman of the 29th Ward.
 Eugenia S. Chapman, Democratic member of the Illinois House of Representatives representing the Arlington Heights area from 1965-1983. She graduated from CSU.
 Marlow H. Colvin, Democratic member of the Illinois House of Representatives from 2001 to 2012.
 Shirley Coleman, politician who served as the 16th ward alderman from 1991-2007.
 Annazette Collins, Democratic member of the Illinois General Assembly serving in the House from 2001-2011 and the Senate from 2011-2013.
 Marcus C. Evans Jr., Democratic member of the Illinois House of Representatives since April 2012.
 Emil Jones III, Democratic member of the Illinois Senate since 2009. He attended CSU.
 Jeremiah E. Joyce, Democratic member of the Illinois Senate from 1979-1993. He earned his masters at CSU.
 Sharon G. Markette, Democratic member of the Illinois House of Representatives from 1983-1985. Markette received her bachelor's degree in criminal justice from CSU.
 Edward Maloney, Democratic member of the Illinois Senate from 2003-2013. He earned his master's degree from CSU.
 Lillian Piotrowski, Democratic member of the Illinois House of Representatives from 1951 to 1964 and member of the Cook County Board of Commissioners from 1964 until her death in 1974. She attended CSU when it was Chicago Teachers College before earning her degree at Loyola University Chicago.
 Al Riley, Democratic member of the Illinois House of Representatives since 2007.
 Nicholas Smith, Democratic member of the Illinois House of Representatives since February 2018. He graduated from CSU with a B.S. in chemistry in 2000.
 Donne E. Trotter, Democratic member of the Illinois Senate from 1993 to 2018.
 Karen Yarbrough, Democratic Cook County Recorder of Deeds since 2010 and former member of the Illinois House of Representatives from 2001 to 2010. She earned her bachelor of business administration degree from CSU in 1973.

International politics
 Bola Tinubu, 12th Governor Lagos State (1999–2007), President-elect of Nigeria (2023–present)

Media
 Warren Ballentine, attorney and Soul 106.3 radio personality.
 Leanita McClain, journalist and commentator. She attended CSU before going to the Medill School of Journalism.

Faculty and staff
 Gwendolyn Brooks, the first African American Pulitzer Prize winner, held a self named Distinguished Professorship at CSU.
 Eliza Atkins Gleason, the first African American to receive a doctorate in library science and associate professor of library science at CSU.
 William Nicholas Hailmann, Chair of the Department of Psychology and History of Education in the early twentieth century.
 Francis Wayland Parker, principal of Cook County Normal School in the nineteenth century.
 Carol Geary Schneider, professor of history at CSU prior to becoming President of the Association of American Colleges and Universities.
 Henry H. Straight, taught at Cook County Normal School in 1883.
 Paul Vallas, served as Chief Administrative Officer in a temporary capacity from February 2017 to January 2018.
 Pharez Whitted, director of jazz studies at Chicago State University
 James Nazy taught Geography and Physical Science courses from 1997-2016. Avid follower of CSU sports programs. Graduate in 1988, 1991.
 Donda West

References

Chicago State University people
Lists of people by university or college in Illinois